The 1983 NASCAR Winston Cup Series was the 35th season of professional stock car racing in the United States and the 12th modern-era Cup series season. The season began on Sunday, February 20 and ended on Sunday, November 20. Bobby Allison was crowned Winston Cup champion at the end of the season finishing 47 points ahead of Darrell Waltrip.

Teams and drivers

Schedule

The Busch Clash was scheduled for Sunday, February 13 but rain forced the race to be postponed until Monday, February 14.

Season Results and Standings

Races

Bold indicates a NASCAR Crown Jewel race.
The Busch 500 was shortened to 419 of 500 laps due to rain.

Winston Cup Final Standings

(key) Bold – Pole position awarded by time. Italics – Pole position set by final practice results or 1982 Owner's points. * – Most laps led.

Rookie of the year
Sterling Marlin was named NASCAR Rookie of the Year. He beat Trevor Boys, Bobby Hillin Jr., Ronnie Hopkins, and Ken Ragan for the award. Of the drivers that competed for the award, only Marlin ran all 30 races. The closest a driver got to competing in all 30 races was Trevor Boys competing in 23 races (skipped rounds 1-6, and 8).

See also
1983 NASCAR Budweiser Late Model Sportsman Series

References

External links 
 Winston Cup Standings and Statistics for 1983

 

NASCAR Cup Series seasons